Gurab-e Jadid (also Romanized as Gūrāb-e Jadīd; also known as Gūrāb) is a village in Paskuh Rural District, Sedeh District, Qaen County, South Khorasan Province, Iran. At the 2006 census, its population was 183, in 43 families.

References 

Populated places in Qaen County